Polanka Hallera  (English: Haller's Valley) is a village in the administrative district of Gmina Skawina, within Kraków County, Lesser Poland Voivodeship, in southern Poland.

The village has a population of 485.

References

Polanka Hallera